Marian is the surname of:

Ciobann Marian, Romanian sprint canoeist in the late 1970s
Ferdinand Marian (1902–1946), Austrian actor
Michèle Marian (born 1963), German actress
Radu Marian (born 1977), Romanian/Moldovan male soprano
Simion Florea Marian (1847-1907), Austro-Hungarian Romanian folklorist and ethnographer
Victor Marian (born 1984), Moldovan footballer
Viorica Marian, American psychologist and professor

Romanian-language surnames